Steven Cliff  Bartlett (born 26 August 1992) is a British businessman and entrepreneur. He's the Co-Founder of Thirdweb, Flight Story and Flight Story Fund. He was the co-founder and co-CEO of Social Chain, however, he stepped down from the latter role in December 2020. In 2022, he began appearing as an investor on the BBC One show Dragons' Den.

Early life and education 
Bartlett was born in Botswana to an English father and Nigerian mother. His mother left school aged seven and could not read or write, his father was a structural engineer. He moved to Plymouth, England at the age of two, where he grew up, attending a secondary school, Plymstock School, and a sixth form. He went to study at Manchester Metropolitan University, but dropped out after one lecture.

Career 
In 2013, Bartlett founded Wallpark.

In 2014, Bartlett co-founded Social Chain, a social media marketing company based in Manchester, UK, with Dominic McGregor.

In 2017, he created a podcast series called The Diary of a CEO, which has featured guests including Liam Payne and Tom Blomfield. As of 2021, it is Europe's most downloaded business podcast and has featured British entrepreneurs Ben Francis, Lee Chambers and Grace Beverley, as well as other public figures including former Health Secretary Matt Hancock and Canadian psychologist Jordan Peterson.

In 2019, Social Chain and German online retailer Lumaland merged to become The Social Chain AG, listing on XETRA and the Düsseldorf Stock Exchange. The listing valued the business at over $200 million. Bartlett’s website initially claimed that he took Social Chain public at age 27, before leaving the company after it reached a valuation of $600 million. These claims were subsequently retracted after The Times reported that Bartlett had left the business more than a year before the floatation, and was not named in its prospectus. In February 2023, Social Chain was acquired by Brave Bison for an initial consideration of £7.7million.

In 2019, he featured in the Channel 4 series The Secret Teacher, going undercover at a school near Liverpool as a teacher.

In December 2020, he created a private equity company called Catena Capital, then joined the board of directors of Huel, a £72 million food replacement company. Bartlett, joins the nutrition company as a non-executive director.

Thirdweb startup cofounded by Steven Bartlett, the host of the hugely Diary of a CEO podcast, has raised $24 million in a Series A that values the startup at $160 million, round led by Katie Haun's $1.5 billion crypto fund.

Steven Bartlett, has launched a £100 million fund to back European entrepreneurs.

Critics

Matt Hancock 
In February 2022, Ed Power of The Telegraph said that Bartlett's interview of Matt Hancock was "as candid as it is awkward." and subsequently gave the episode 3 out of 5 stars.

Breaching guidelines on advertising 
The BBC, which currently airs The Dragons Den, reprimanded Bartlett in March 2022 for breaching BBC guidelines on advertising. In a statement, they told The Radio Times, "We have clear guidelines around talent’s commercial activity while working with us. Steven has been reminded of the guidelines." In a statement, Bartlett addressed the issue, adding: "This was a genuine oversight on my part. The posts have now been taken down.

The Advertising Standards Authority (United Kingdom) took action against Barlett in August 2022 for breaching the CAP Code (Edition 12) rules 2.1, 2.3 and 2.4 in which he covertly advertised meal replacement firm Huel. The ASA ruled that the advertisement must not appear again in its current form and subsequently advised Barlett and Huel to "ensure that they made clear the commercial intent of advertising content in podcasts in future, for example by including a clear and prominent identifier such as “advertisement” and making sure the break from editorial content to the ad was clearly and audibly identified."

Exaggerated valuation claims 
Steven has been critiqued by The New Statesman as an entrepreneur who "styles himself as a business guru but beneath the clichés lies a thinly veiled craving for celebrity"

The Times amongst other significant newspapers, questioned the validity of Bartlett’s supposed fortune and fame in 2023, citing public documents which show that the company he founded recently sold for £7.7m., a stark contrast to Bartlett's own words on a recent episode of Dragons’ Den, where he claimed: "I built a £300 million business at 28 years old!". The company later sold for £7.7m, according to the BBC.

James Hurley, Enterprise Editor of The Times, said in his investigation that "..the rise of Social Chain AG to a nine-figure valuation may owe more to mattresses and a wealthy 65-year-old media tycoon than Bartlett’s leadership." On February 13, 2023, The Times reported that Bartlett is not the tycoon he claims to be built and floated Social Chain with a market valuation in excess of $600 million. In return, the article became the subject of a legal complaint from Steven Bartlett.

Books
In 2021, Bartlett released his debut book, Happy Sexy Millionaire, which was a Sunday Times bestseller. In May 2021, it was confirmed that Bartlett, aged 28, would be the youngest-ever investor on the long-running BBC show Dragons' Den.

Recognition
In 2018, the digital marketing community Econsultancy named him "The most influential figure in the industry." In 2020 he was inducted into the Manchester Hall of Fame. In the same year he was included in the Forbes 30 Under 30 list. Bartlett has been a speaker more than 400 times, including at the United Nations, SXSW (an annual event in Austin, USA) and Ted Talk conferences (an American private non-profit foundation).

References

External links 
 

Living people
British company founders
Botswana people
Businesspeople from Plymouth, Devon
Mass media people from Plymouth, Devon
1992 births
British people of Botswana descent
British people of Nigerian descent
Botswana emigrants to the United Kingdom